The Tuhala is a river on the northern part of Estonia. It has its source in the Mahtra Marsh and discharges into the Pirita river. During its 26 km long journey it meets with Tuhala. The catchment area of the river is 112 km2.

Sources
 Info in eestigiid.ee (in Estonian language)

Rivers of Estonia
Kose Parish